The Democratic Union (UD) was a small social-liberal political party in Italy.

It was founded in February 1996 by Antonio Maccanico, along with Willer Bordon and Giorgio Benvenuto (both members of Democratic Alliance), Valerio Zanone (a former leader of the Italian Liberal Party) and Giorgio La Malfa (leader of the Italian Republican Party). The party was a minor member of  The Olive Tree, and formed the Populars for Prodi list with the Italian People's Party for the 1996 general election, electing five deputies and one senator.

The party was part of the Prodi I Cabinet, with Maccanico becoming minister for Communications, and later the D'Alema I Cabinet, D'Alema II Cabinet and Amato II Cabinet with Maccanico minister of Institutional Reforms.

In 1999 the party joined Romano Prodi's new party, The Democrats.

References

1996 establishments in Italy
1999 disestablishments in Italy
Defunct political parties in Italy
Liberal parties in Italy
Political parties established in 1996
Political parties disestablished in 1999